Korrakot Wiriyaudomsiri (born January 19, 1988), simply known as Ming, is a Thai professional footballer who plays as a  left-back for Thai League 1 club Chiangmai United and the Thailand national team Korrakot is a free kick specialist.

International career

In October 10, he debuted for Thailand in a friendly match against Bahrain. In October 15, he played his second match against Iran. In 2018 he was called up by Thailand national team for the 2018 AFF Suzuki Cup. In that same tournament, he scored a spectacular goal from a corner kick, which would also be his first international goal for Thailand.

International

International goals 
Scores and results list Thailand's goal tally first.

Honours

Club
Buriram United
 Thai League 1 (2): 2017, 2018
 Thailand Champions Cup (1): 2019

References

External links
 Profile at Goal
 https://th.soccerway.com/players/korakod-wiriyaudomsiri/288011/

1988 births
Living people
Korrakot Wiriyaudomsiri
Korrakot Wiriyaudomsiri
Association football fullbacks
Korrakot Wiriyaudomsiri
Korrakot Wiriyaudomsiri
Korrakot Wiriyaudomsiri
Korrakot Wiriyaudomsiri
Korrakot Wiriyaudomsiri
Korrakot Wiriyaudomsiri
Korrakot Wiriyaudomsiri
Korrakot Wiriyaudomsiri
2019 AFC Asian Cup players